Andrew Chapman OAM, is an Australian photojournalist.

Biography
Andrew Chapman was born in Melbourne on 29 June 1954 to parents John L. Chapman, export manager at the Australian Wheat Board, and Elizabeth R. Chapman (Stubbings) a writer. He trained at Prahran College of Advanced Education 1974-6, where he was taught by Athol Shmith, John Cato and Paul Cox, whom he remembers;
<blockquote>"These 3 fabulous image makers helped inspire a generation of photographers that went on to make their mark in Australian society and overseas...The Photographic dept, in the bowels of the Arts Building was eternally underfunded, except in one area, "creativity". I for one still remember many of the sayings Cato would weekly give out, like, "evolution breeds in adversity"</blockquote>

In his studies Chapman specialised in documentary, photojournalism & landscape photography.  From 1978 he first worked for The Melbourne Times, then for Syme Community Newspapers and has since been a freelancer contributing toTime, on the cover of which his work featured more than a dozen times, BRW and The Bulletin, as well as Australian newspapers.

Rural Australia, its human and animal inhabitants, European and indigenous, the harshness and beauty of the Australian bush landscape, its vernacular architecture, and lively Australian Federal politics are Chapman's main photographic subjects. All entail frequent long-distance travel across the island continent, and the work of Jeff Carter is an inspiration to him in that regard; his advice to other photographers is to "explore Australia’s ‘inner circle’, away from the cities and coast."

Since 2006, Chapman has published nine books and has made photographic contributions to others’. He has exhibited in Australia, France and the USA.

In 2011 Chapman had a liver transplant, during which he was almost blinded due to a viral infection, prompting him to hold a 2012 exhibition Nearly A Retrospective, a survey of four decades of his work. Chris Franklin recorded Andrew's recollection of events around the transplant and reflections on his lifelong calling in photography in Yellow which won the international Lift-Off Global Network Best Short Documentary in 2019.

MAP Group 
In 1998, with a group of other professional photographers seeking to rekindle the tradition of documentary photography, Chapman founded MAP – Many Australian Photographers, its title later simplified to MAP Group, with Chapman the inaugural president. He initiated a project of the group resulting in a widely viewed exhibition that toured the country for 5 years, and publication; ‘Beyond Reasonable Drought’, recording global warming-induced drought across Australia.

Chapman's mentorship of other photographers extends also beyond the MAP Group.

Awards
Finalist in:

 Moran Photographic Prize
 New North Photographic Prize
Bowness Photography Prize
 Head On Landscape Prize.

In 2014, Chapman was awarded an OAM in the Australia Day Honours for his service to the arts as a photographer.

Exhibitions
Solo
 2017: Giving Life, charting the pathways of Organ Donation, Flinders Medical centre Adelaide, touring nationally.
2016, July: Giving Life, charting the pathways of Organ Donation, Magnet Galleries, Bourke St Melbourne 
2016/2017, 10 November–29 January: Drive Line: Andrew Chapman at Ford Broadmeadows, Gee Lee-Wik Doleen Gallery, Craigieburn Hume Global Learning Centre, 75-95 Central Park Avenue, Craigieburn
 2015: Wool & Politics, Metropolis gallery, Geelong
 2012: Nearly A Retrospective, 60 print show survey of four decades, Burrinja Gallery, Upwey
 2012, May–June: Palimpsest, Images from a Disappearing Landscape, Hume Global Learning Centre, Craigieburn
 2011: The Mark Of Time, New North Gallery, Fairfield
 2008, April–May: Campaign & Italian Visions, New North Gallery, Faifield
 2007, February – April: Campaign, Old Parliament House, Canberra
 2004 – 2012: The Shearers, 60 monochrome documentary Images. Touring the Eastern States of Australia at 14 venues including The Monash Gallery of Art, The State Library of NSW, Shear Outback Hay NSW, Museum of The Riverina, The National Wool Museum, Geelong and The Daylesford Foto Biennale 2007.
 2005, October: Knox Sporting Heroes, 32 B&W documentary Images celebrating community sporting personalities. Knox City Council Offices and other locations.
 2005, January. Yering Station, Yarra Valley
 2004, June: Lanyon Homestead, Canberra, ACT.
 2003, September: CP Photo Galleries, East Sydney, NSW.
 2003, June Journeys, 20 monochrome landscape prints, Toorak South Yarra Library, South Yarra
 2003: Ways Of Seeing, 35 colour landscape and portrait prints. Cooks Corner Gallery & Tearooms, Kallista
 2002, January: Shear Outback, Hay, NSW.
 2000, February: Click : Rural Photographs by Andrew Chapman, 60 black and white documentary prints. National Wool Museum, Geelong
 2000, June: The Gold Museum, Ballarat, Vic.

Group
 2008 Beyond Reasonable Drought, Old Parliament House, Canberra and touring nationally over 5 years. Chapman led 38 professional photographers to document climate change and drought across Australia.
 2006-07 Making Hay. Instigator of a team of 27 professional photographers documenting the NSW town of Hay in April 2006, donating 100 prints to the Hay community as a visual record. Exhibited at Shear Outback Museum, Hay, Span Gallery, Melbourne 2006 and Castlemaine State Festival in March–April 2007
 2006, April: Australian Chronicles, 11 Prints from "The Shearers" series, part of a group show. Photo Visions Gallery, Montpellier, France. Images reshown during the 2007 Rugby World Cup.
 2005-2007: Snapping St Arnaud. Chapman led a team of 16 professional photographers in documenting the Victorian town of St Arnaud in Sept 2005, donating 107 prints to their community as a visual record. Exhibited at the Kara Kara Shire Hall, St Arnaud. Feature exhibition, "Daylesford Foto Biennale", June 2007
 2005, July: Leica CCP Photojournalism Awards, 6 monochrome prints on political campaigns. Centre For Contemporary Photography, Fitzroy, Vic.
 2005, June Che Evoca, landscapes of Italy, CP Photo Galleries, East Sydney, NSW.
 1998: Ararat, A Rural Town In Focus''. Instigator of a team of 40 professional photographers that documented the Victorian town of Ararat in 1998, donating 107 prints to their community as a visual record. Exhibited 1998, Ararat Regional Gallery, Ararat, Vic.

Publications
 
 
 
 
 *

Contributions
 
 
 
 
 
 Cover of 
 
 
 
 Images throughout

Collections
 National Library of Australia
 The State Library of Victoria
 Monash Gallery of Art
 City of Montpellier

References

External links
 Andrew Chapman website
 Andrew Chapman Campaign photograph collection, 1975-2004 at the National Library of Australia
 Chris Franklin Yellow, an award-winning short documentary on Andrew Chapman

Australian photojournalists
1954 births
Living people
Recipients of the Medal of the Order of Australia